Walter Risse (2 December 1893 – 16 June 1969) was a German international footballer who played for Düsseldorfer SC 99 and Hamburger SV.

References

External links

1893 births
1969 deaths
Association football defenders
German footballers
Germany international footballers
Hamburger SV players
FC St. Pauli managers
VfL Wolfsburg managers
German football managers
Footballers from Düsseldorf
West German football managers